Choghabur-e Rahman (also Romanized as Choghābūr-e Raḩmān; also known as Choqābūr-e Raḩmān) is a village in Gurani Rural District, Gahvareh District, Dalahu County, Kermanshah Province, Iran. At the 2006 census, its population was 117, in 24 families.

References 

Populated places in Dalahu County